Kawamori (written: 川森 or 河森 lit. "river forest") is a Japanese surname. Notable people with the surname include:

, Japanese anime creator, producer and screenwriter
, Japanese footballer

Japanese-language surnames